The Marusagar Express is a weekly express train that runs between Ajmer and Ernakulam, connecting Rajasthan, Madhya Pradesh, Gujarat, Maharashtra, Goa, Karnataka to Kerala.  The train runs through four zones of Indian Railways, travelling 2860 km in around 48 hours. There are 32 halts along the way. It starts from Ajmer on Friday morning and reaches Ernakulam Junction on Sunday early morning, and starts back to Ajmer on Sunday evening to reach Ajmer on Tuesday afternoon.

History
The service of this train was proposed in year 1999 rail budget from Indore Junction railway station of Indore, Madhya Pradesh as Indore–Mangalore Weekly Express but due to non-availability of the rake and traction and delay in the service at Mangalore, the erstwhile Indore–Chennai Ahilyanagari Express got extended to Cochin & Trivandrum Central via Ernakulam.
A weekly train was also started from Indore Junction to Kochuveli via Mangalore.
From 2009 September onwards, the service of this train was extended up to Ajmer Junction. It is the fourth fastest train of North Western Railways after 12973/12974 Indore–Jaipur Express, 12181/12182 Jaipur–Jabalpur Super Fast Express & 12465/12466 Jodhpur–Indore Intercity Express. This train is in the "Superfast" category, and so has more importance than normal passenger and express train.

Origin of name
The word "MaruSagar" essentially means "Desert-Ocean". The word "Maru" refers to the Thar Desert in Rajasthan and the word "Sagar" refers to the ocean (the Arabian Sea). Thus, the train connects the desert state of Rajasthan to the Arabian Sea coast in the West. After Vadodara, the train travels along the western coast of India beside the Arabian Sea.

Train details
12978 DN Ajmer -> Ernakulam (Friday)
12977 UP Ernakulam -> Ajmer (Sunday)

Train composition

LOCO-SLR-GS-GS-S1-S2-S3-S4-S5-S6-S7-S8-S9-S10-PC-B5-B4-B3-B2-B1-A1-HB1-GS-GS-SLR;

Loco link
The train runs hauls by a Bhagat Ki Kothi-based WDP-4 or WDP-4B or WDP-4D diesel locomotive on its entire journey.

See also
 Konkan Railway

References 

Transport in Ajmer
Transport in Kochi
Railway services introduced in 2001
Named passenger trains of India
Rail transport in Kerala
Express trains in India
Rail transport in Goa
Rail transport in Madhya Pradesh
Rail transport in Maharashtra
Rail transport in Rajasthan
Rail transport in Gujarat